Walter Forster (22 January 1900  – 14 December 1968) was an Austrian screenwriter.

Selected filmography 
 End of the Rainbow (1930)
 A Door Opens (1933)
 Enjoy Yourselves (1934)
 Miss Liselott (1934)
 Marriage Strike (1935)
 Marionette (1939)
 Through the Forests and Through the Trees (1956)
 The Royal Waltz (1935, 1955)
 Susanne in the Bath (1936)
 Togger (1937)
 The Irresistible Man (1937)
 Mistake of the Heart (1939)
 Between Hamburg and Haiti (1940)
 Happiness is the Main Thing (1941)
 Mask in Blue (1943)
 Knall and Fall as Imposters  (1952)
 The Rose of Stamboul (1953)
 The Divorcée (1953)
 Mask in Blue (1953)
 Prisoners of Love (1954)
 The Royal Waltz (1955)
 Without You All Is Darkness (1956)
 The Ideal Woman (1959)
 Final Accord (1960)

References

External links 

Austrian male screenwriters
1900 births
1968 deaths
20th-century Austrian screenwriters
20th-century Austrian male writers